Ma Jaya Sati Bhagavati (May 26, 1940 – April 14, 2012), often shortened to Ma Jaya, was a devotee of Hindu Guru Neem Karoli Baba. She founded Kashi Ashram in Sebastian, Florida, in 1976. Jaya's interfaith teachings included a blend of philosophy from many different religions. She was involved in HIV/AIDS activism and hunger alleviation.

Early life and spiritual beginnings 
Ma Jaya was born Joyce Green in Brooklyn, New York, and grew up in a cellar apartment near Brighton Beach. Her mother died from cancer when Jaya was thirteen years old. Ma Jaya said that as a young girl, she had conversations with unhoused people who lived underneath the Coney Island boardwalk. The interactions led her to spend more time on Coney Island where she eventually met her future husband, Sal DiFiore.

Ma Jaya and DiFiore married in 1956 and had three children. Jaya struggled with obesity in her thirties and in 1972 enrolled in a Jack LaLanne weight-loss class where she learned a breathing exercise for weight loss. While practicing the breathing exercise at her home, she claimed to have a series of mystical visions of Jesus Christ, Bhagawan Nityananda, and Neem Karoli Baba. After an alleged experience of stigmata, Jaya began meditating on a regular basis and became acquainted with spiritual teacher Hilda Charlton who helped to introduce her to spiritual seekers in the New York area.

Kashi Ashram
Ma Jaya moved to Indian River County, Florida, in 1976 where she founded Kashi Ashram. The  property, on the St. Sebastian River just west of the city of Sebastian, was developed in part by students. The ashram has a communal living structure; residents help with maintenance, food preparation, and participation in yoga and meditation practices. At one time, the ashram had more than two hundred residents.

A K–12 primary and secondary education center called the River School (originally the Ranch School) was opened in the early 1980s and closed after graduating its final class in 2005.

An HIV/AIDS education and prevention program named the River Fund was created in 1990 and is still in operation.

An affordable living community named By the River was opened in 2009 and included accommodations for forty low-income seniors. By the River was foreclosed in 2013.

The Kashi Ashram community remains active and includes a retreat center, yoga school, and sustainable farm. The retreat was visited by Julia Roberts after she discovered Ma Jaya's teachings when researching her role for the 2010 film Eat Pray Love.

Satellite branches of Kashi Ashram were established in New York, Los Angeles, Chicago, Colorado, Santa Fe, and Atlanta. Kashi Atlanta Ashram was founded in 1999 in the Candler Park neighborhood by Jaya Devi Bhagavati.

Criticism 
Ma Jaya faced accusations of emotional and physical abuse, substance use, and the promotion of cult-like practices. The Kashi Church Foundation has denied these allegations.

American spiritual teacher Ram Dass wrote a 1976 Yoga Journal article entitled "Egg on My Beard" which criticized Ma Jaya's teaching style as "disquieting" and referred to her as "Ms. Big" and an embodiment of the Hindu Goddess Kali. Dass asserted that Jaya asked him and other followers to purchase costly gold bracelets and semiprecious gemstones for her personal use in grounding practices during and after meditation. He went on to narrate an alleged incident in which Jaya, accompanied by a group of her followers, climbed an eighteen-story apartment building in New York City to gain access to his residence without his permission.

Rick Alan Ross, a self-styled cult specialist, referred to Ma Jaya as a "charismatic leader of a potentially destructive cult."

Paul R. Martin, clinical psychologist and founder of Wellspring Retreat and Resource Center described Kashi Ashram as "having all the markings of a cult."

A 1993 People magazine article entitled "It's not just Waco--Cults rule by paranoia flourish under America" criticized Kashi Ashram.

In 2013, Ma Jaya's youngest daughter sued the Kashi Church Foundation in a Miami court, claiming that in 1981 she was sexually assaulted by a church member after being married to him against her will. Jaya's daughter claimed that on December 10, 1981, she was married to 25-year-old Kevin Brannon so that she could be impregnated to allegedly provide more church members for Ma Jaya. The Kashi Ashram and Brannon deny the sexual assault ever happened.

Ma Jaya is said to have ordered marriages between devotees who "barely knew each other," although most seemed to consent, according to follower Lyn Deadmore writing in her journal in 1981. A spokesperson for Kashi Ashram denies these arranged marriages occurred.

1989 and 2001 court filings alleged that Jaya manipulated followers into giving her custody of their children.

Publications and artwork
Ma Jaya authored a number of publications including Deep and Simple Wisdom: Spiritual Teachings of Ma Jaya Sati Bhagavati, The 11 Karmic Spaces: Choosing Freedom from the Patterns That Bind You and, The River. Jaya was an accomplished artist and primarily used acrylic on canvas to depict complex scenes involving Hindu deities and abstract storytelling that illustrated scenes of Universal spiritual wisdom.

Death 
Ma Jaya died of pancreatic cancer on April 13, 2012, at her home in Kashi Ashram. A memorial service was held in her honor at Kashi Ashram on May 26, 2012.

Honours and affiliations 
According to the Kashi foundation, Ma Jaya was widely recognized for her work and was a recipient of many awards and honors. However, many of these awards are unverifiable.

 Recipient, Interfaith Visionary Award, 2010 from the Temple of Understanding.
 Recipient of Humanitarian Service Award 2007 from the Gandhi Foundation.
 Recipient of title Mata Maha Mandaleshwar from the Ma Yoga Shakti Mission
 Recipient of the Interparliamentary Paradigm of Peace Award.
 Recipient of the United Foundation for AIDS Award.
 Recipient of the Universal Way Award.
 Inducted into the Martin Luther King Jr. Board of Preachers, Morehouse College.

Ma Jaya had many affiliations with various international organisations, including:

 Trustee Emeritus of the Council for the Parliament of the World's Religions
 Advisory Board Member of Equal Partners in Faith
 Advisory Board Member of the Institute on Religion and Public Policy
 Advisory Board Member of the Gardner's Syndrome Association
 Delegate to the United Religions Initiative
 Member of the Board of Directors of the AIDS care organization Project Response
 Member of the Parliament's General Assembly.

References

External links
 Kashi Ashram Spiritual Community Website

2012 deaths
20th-century American Jews
1940 births
Deaths from pancreatic cancer
Deaths from cancer in Florida
21st-century American Jews